Julio Bayón (born 18 November 1978) is an Argentinean retired footballer.

References

Argentine footballers
Living people
1978 births
Association football midfielders
Deportivo Armenio footballers
Rosario Central footballers